The Chairperson, Central Board of Direct Taxes  (CBDT) is the senior-most IRS (IT) civil servant in the Government of India. The Chairperson of Central Board of Direct Taxes  (CBDT) is the Special Secretary to the Government of India and also cadre controlling authority of the Indian Revenue Service (Income Tax).

The CBDT Chairperson is a Special Secretary and reports to the Revenue Secretary of India.
He is placed equivalent to officers of the rank of Lieutenant-General, Vice-Admiral or Air Marshal, CBI Director and Deputy Comptroller and Auditor General in the Order of Precedence.

Functions
The following are the functions of the Chairman:
 Administrative planning of the Income Tax Department.
 Act as advisor and conscience keeper of the Indian Revenue Service.
 Handle senior appointments.
 Represents the Finance Ministry at important tax-based conferences at UN and OECD. 
 Transfers and postings of officers in the cadre of Chief Commissioner of Income-tax and Commissioner of Income-tax.
 Matters dealt with in the Foreign Tax and Tax Research Division, except matters under Section 80-O of the Income-tax Act, 1961.
 Ensure that the Cabinet decisions are implemented
 Advise the Finance Minister of India.
 All matters relating to Central and Regional Direct Taxes Advisory Committees and Consultative Committee of the Parliament.
 Public Grievances.
 Provide an element of continuity and stability to administration during crises.

Emolument, accommodation and perquisites 
As the Chairperson, CBDT is of the rank of Secretary to Government of India, his/her salary is equivalent to Chief Secretaries of State Governments and to Vice Chief of Army Staff/Commanders, in the rank of Lieutenant General and equivalent ranks in Indian Armed Forces.

List of CBDT Chairpersons

Notes

See also
 Principal Secretary (India)
 Chairperson Central Board of Excise & Customs

References

External links
Official Portal of the Indian Government
Union Public Service Commission

Lists of Indian civil servants
Indian Civil Services
Income Tax Department of India
Indian government officials